Habib Fardan Abdulla Fardan Al Fardan (born 11 November 1990) is an Emirati professional association football player who plays for Ittihad Kalba as an attacking midfielder.

Club career
He started playing in Al Wasl, when he was older he went to Al Nasr. He joined Al Ahli in summer 2014 after he was linked in Al Jazira.

On 7 August 2018, Fardan returned to Al Nasr.

International career
In June 2011, Al Fardan made his international debut in a 2–3 loss to Kuwait in a friendly match. He played for United Arab Emirates at the 2012 Summer Olympics.

International goals
Scores and results list United Arab Emirates' goal tally first.

Honours
AFC Asian Cup third-place (1): 2015

References

External links

1990 births
Living people
Emirati footballers
United Arab Emirates international footballers
Al-Wasl F.C. players
Al-Nasr SC (Dubai) players
Al Ahli Club (Dubai) players
Shabab Al-Ahli Club players
Al-Ittihad Kalba SC players
Footballers at the 2012 Summer Olympics
Olympic footballers of the United Arab Emirates
2015 AFC Asian Cup players
UAE Pro League players
Association football midfielders